El Sol  is a newspaper published in Santa Cruz de la Sierra, Bolivia.

References

Newspapers published in Bolivia
Mass media in Santa Cruz de la Sierra
Spanish-language newspapers